Arney is a surname. Notable people with the surname include:

Angela Arney, British writer
George Arney (1810–1883), New Zealand lawyer
George Arney (journalist), British journalist
Helen Arney, British physicist
Kat Arney, British science communicator